Sidha Lal Murmu was an Indian politician. He was elected to the Lok Sabha, the lower house of the Parliament of India as a member of the Indian National Congress.

References

External links
Official biographical sketch in Parliament of India website

Lok Sabha members from Odisha
India MPs 1984–1989
1935 births
1999 deaths
Indian National Congress politicians from Odisha